Luxembourg competed at the 2019 World Aquatics Championships in Gwangju, South Korea from 12 to 28 July.

High diving

Luxembourg qualified one male high diver.

Swimming

Luxembourg entered five swimmers.

Men

Women

Mixed

References

World Aquatics Championships
2019
Nations at the 2019 World Aquatics Championships